Laine Erik (married name Kallas; born 21 April 1942) is an Estonian agricultural scientist and a retired middle-distance runner.

Running
Erik specialized in the 800 metres. In this event she finished sixth at the 1964 Olympics, while at the 1968 Games she was eliminated in semifinals. She won the Soviet titles in 1964, 1967 and 1968. In 1965 she won a gold medal at the Summer Universiade, and in 1964 she was part of the Soviet 3×800 m team that set a world record.

Science
She graduated from the Zootechnics Faculty of Estonian Agricultural Academy in 1969 and in 1984 defended a PhD in agricultural sciences. Between 1969 and 1996 she worked as a researcher at the Institute of Animal Science of Estonian Agricultural University, and after that as a company manager.

References

1942 births
Living people
People from Türi Parish
Estonian agronomists
Estonian female middle-distance runners
Soviet female middle-distance runners
Athletes (track and field) at the 1964 Summer Olympics
Athletes (track and field) at the 1968 Summer Olympics
Olympic athletes of the Soviet Union
Universiade medalists in athletics (track and field)
Universiade gold medalists for the Soviet Union
Medalists at the 1965 Summer Universiade